The butterfly (colloquially shortened to fly) is a swimming stroke swum on the chest, with both arms moving symmetrically, accompanied by the butterfly kick (also known as the "dolphin kick") along with movement of the hips.  While other styles like the breaststroke, front crawl, or backstroke can be swum adequately by beginners, the butterfly is a more difficult stroke that requires a good technique as well as strong muscles. It is the newest swimming style swum in competition, first swum in 1933 and originating out of the breaststroke.

Speed and ergonomics 
The butterfly stroke boasts a higher peak velocity than the front crawl, owing to the synchronous propulsion generated by the simultaneous pull/push of both arms and legs. However, due to the pronounced drop in speed during the recovery phase, it is marginally slower than the front crawl, especially over extended distances. Furthermore, the butterfly stroke demands a different level of physical exertion, contributing to its slower overall pace than the front crawl.

The breaststroke, backstroke, and front crawl can all be swum easily, even if the swimmer's technique is not the best. The butterfly, however, is unforgiving of mistakes in style; it is very difficult to overcome a poor butterfly technique with brute strength. Many swimmers and coaches consider it the most difficult swimming style. Beginner swimmers struggle with synchronous over-water recovery, particularly when incorporating breathing. This requires lifting both arms, the head, shoulders, and part of the chest out of the water. However, with proper technique, the stroke becomes fluid and swift. Once the efficient technique has been developed, it becomes a smooth, fast stroke.

History 

The International Swimming Hall of Fame credits Australian Sydney Cavill as the originator of the butterfly stroke. Cavill (1881–1945), the son of a "swimming professor" Frederick Cavill, was 220 yards amateur champion of Australia at the age of 16. He followed his famous brothers to America and coached notable swimmers at San Francisco's Olympic Club.

In late 1933, Henry Myers swam a butterfly stroke in competition at the Brooklyn Central YMCA. The butterfly style evolved from the breaststroke. David Armbruster, swimming coach at the University of Iowa, researched the breaststroke, especially considering the drag problem due to the underwater recovery. In 1934 Armbruster refined a method to bring the arms forward over the water in a breaststroke. He called this style "butterfly". While the butterfly was difficult, it brought a great improvement in speed. One year later, in 1935, Jack Sieg, a swimmer also from the University of Iowa, developed a kick technique involving swimming on his side and beating his legs in unison, similar to a fish tail, and then modified the technique afterward to swim it face down. He called this style Dolphin fishtail kick. Armbruster and Sieg quickly found that combining these techniques created a very fast swimming style consisting of butterfly arms with two dolphin kicks per cycle. Richard Rhodes claims that Volney Wilson invented the 'Dolphin' after studying fish, and used it to win the 1938 US Olympic Trials, earning him a disqualification.

This new style was substantially faster than a regular breaststroke. Using this technique Jack Sieg swam 100 yards in 1:00.2. However, the dolphin fishtail kick violated the breaststroke rules set by FINA and was not allowed. Therefore, the butterfly arms with a breaststroke kick were used by a few swimmers in the 1936 Summer Olympics in Berlin for the breaststroke competitions. In 1938, almost every breaststroke swimmer was using this butterfly style. Yet, this stroke was considered a variant of the breaststroke until 1952, when it was accepted by FINA as a separate style with its own set of rules. The 1956 Summer Olympics were the first Olympic games where the butterfly has swum as a separate competition, 100 m (women) and 200 m (men).

Technique 
The butterfly technique with the dolphin kick consists of synchronous arm movement with a synchronous leg kick. Good technique is crucial to swim this style effectively. The wave-like body movement is also very significant in creating propulsion, as this is the key to easy synchronous over-water recovery and breathing.

The swimmer is face down at the start, arms out front, and legs extended behind.

Arm movement 
The butterfly stroke has three major parts, the pull, the push, and the recovery. These can also be further subdivided. The arm movement starts very similarly to the breaststroke from the initial position. In the beginning, the hands sink a little bit with the palms facing outwards, and slightly down at shoulder width, then the hands move out to create a Y. This is called catching the water. The pull movement follows a semicircle with the elbow higher than the hand and the hand pointing towards the center of the body and downward to form the traditionally taught "keyhole".

The push propels the palm backwards through the water, starting beneath and ending at the side of the body. The swimmer only pushes the arms 1/3 of the way to the hips, making it easier to enter into the recovery and making the recovery shorter and making the breathing window shorter. The movement increases speed throughout the pull-push phase until the hand is the fastest at the end of the push. This step is called the release and is crucial for recovery. The speed at the end of the push is used to help with the recovery.

In the recovery, the arms are swung sideways across the water surface to the front, with the elbows straight. The arms should be swung forward from the end of the underwater movement; the extension of the triceps in combination with the butterfly kick will allow the arm to be brought forward quickly and relaxedly. In contrast to the front crawl recovery, the arm recovery is a ballistic shot, letting gravity and momentum do most of the work. The only way to lift the arms and the shoulders out of the water would be by dropping one's hips. Therefore, the recovery, at least the acceleration of the arms, is in no way relaxed . It is important not to enter the water too early because this would generate extra resistance as the arms move forward against the swimming direction. However, during longer distances, this is not easy to avoid, and it is more important to avoid dropping one's hips. A high elbow recovery, akin to that observed in the front crawl, would prove detrimental to the efficiency of the butterfly stroke due to the resultant undulations and the diminution of momentum generated by the triceps extension. Limitations of shoulder movement in the human body make such a move unlikely. The hands should enter the water with a narrow V shape (at 11 and 1 o'clock, if viewed like a clock) with thumbs entering first and pinkies last.

The arms enter the water with the thumbs first at shoulder width. A wider entry loses movement in the next pull phase, and if the hands touch, it will waste energy. The cycle repeats with the pull phase. However, some swimmers prefer to touch in front as it assists them in grasping the water. As long as they can perform this action efficiently, they do not incur any disadvantage.

Leg movement 
The legs move together using different muscles. The shoulders rise with a strong up and medium down kick, then lower with a strong down and up kick. A fluid undulation connects the motion.

The feet are pressed together to avoid loss of water pressure. The feet naturally point downwards, give thrust downwards, move up the feet, and press down the head.

There is no stipulation in competitive butterfly rules that a swimmer makes a fixed number of pulses in butterfly–the swimmer may kick as little or as much as they wish.  While competitive rules allow such a choice, the typical method of swimming butterfly is with two kicks.

As butterfly originated as a variant of breaststroke, it would be performed with a breaststroke or whip kick by some swimmers. While breaststroke was separated from butterfly in 1953, the breaststroke kick in butterfly was not officially outlawed until 2001. However several Masters swimmers were upset with the change since they came from a time when butterfly usually swam with a breaststroke kick.  FINA was then convinced to allow a breaststroke kick in Masters swimming.  Given the option, most swimmers use a dolphin-kicking action. However, there still is a small minority of swimmers who prefer the breaststroke kick for recreational swimming and even for competition.

Breathing 
There is only a short window for breathing in the butterfly. If this window is missed, swimming becomes very difficult. Optimally, a butterfly swimmer synchronizes the taking of breaths with the undulation of the body to simplify the breathing process; doing this well requires some attention to butterfly stroke technique. The breathing process begins during the stroke's underwater "press" portion. The body naturally rises toward the water's surface as the hands and forearms move underneath the chest. The swimmer can lift the head to fully break the surface with minimum effort. The swimmer breathes in through the mouth. The head goes back in the water after the arms come out of the water as they swing forward over the surface. If the head stays out too long, the recovery is hindered.

Normally, swimmers take a breath every other stroke, which can be maintained over long distances. Often, breathing every stroke slows the swimmer down. (At a certain level, a breathing stroke becomes just as fast as a nonbreathing stroke; therefore, highly experienced competitors, such as Michael Phelps, may breathe every stroke.) Elite swimmers practice breathing intervals such as the "two up, one down" approach. They breathe for two successive strokes, then keep their head in the water on the next stroke for easier breathing. Swimmers with good lung capacity might also breathe every 3rd stroke during sprints for the finish. Some swimmers can even hold their breaths for an entire race (assuming it is short). To swim with the best results, keeping one's head down when taking a breath is important. If the swimmer lifts their head too high, the swimmer's hips often drop, creating drag, thus slowing the swimmer down. The closer one's head is to the water; the better one swims the general technique used by swimmers.

Body movement 
The proper utilization of the core muscles, in conjunction with precise timing and fluid body movement, greatly facilitates the execution of the butterfly stroke. The body moves in a wave-like fashion, controlled by the core, and as the chest is pressed down, the hips go up, and the posterior breaks the water surface and transfers into a fluid kick. During the push phase, the chest goes up, and the hips are at their lowest position. In this style, the second pulse in the cycle is stronger than the first one, as the second one is more in flow with the body movement.

Although butterfly is very compatible with diving, the resulting reduction in wave drag does not lead to an overall drag reduction. In the modern style of the butterfly stroke, one does only a little vertical movement of the body.

Start 
Butterfly uses the regular start for swimming. After the start, a gliding phase follows underwater, followed by dolphin kicks swimming underwater. Swimming underwater reduces the drag from breaking the surface and is very economical. Rules allow for 15 m underwater swimming before the head breaks the surface and regular swimming begins.

Turn and finish 
Both hands must simultaneously touch the wall during turns and finish while the swimmer remains swimming face down. The swimmer touches the wall with both hands while bending the elbows slightly. The bent elbows allow the swimmer to push themself away from the wall and turn sideways. One hand leaves the wall to be moved to the front underwater. At the same time, the legs are pulled closer and moved underneath the body towards the wall. The second-hand leaves the wall to be moved to the front over water. It is commonly referred to as an "over/under turn" or an "open turn". The legs touch the wall, and the hands are at the front. The swimmer sinks underwater and lies on the breast, or nearly so. Then the swimmer pushes off the wall, keeping a streamlined position with the hands to the front. Like the start, the swimmer is allowed to swim 15 m underwater before the head breaks the surface. Most swimmers' dolphin kick after an initial gliding phase.

The finish requires the swimmer to touch the wall with both hands simultaneously in the same horizontal plane.

Styles 
There are four styles of the butterfly stroke.

Two main styles of butterfly stroke seen today are: "arm pull up simultaneous with dolphin kick" and "arm pull down simultaneous with dolphin kick".

"Arm pull up simultaneous with dolphin kick":
After the head goes underwater, both arms go underwater but are still higher than the head. After the first dolphin kick, pull both arms immediately with downward motion. While pulling, arms and legs are relaxed, and both knees and waist are slightly bent to prepare the dolphin kick. After the arms push the water backwards, pull the arms up simultaneously with a dolphin kick. In this style, the turning point from drowning to floating  is at the time of downward arm motion.

"Arm pull down simultaneous with dolphin kick":
After the head goes underwater, both arms go underwater until lower than the head. After the first dolphin kick, raise both arms with relax. While rising arms, bend both knees and waist to send the body back to the surface and prepare a dolphin kick. Pull both arms downward while executing the dolphin kick. After this sequence, immediately push the water backward. In this style, a turning point from drowning to floating is at the time of the waist bend.

Two additional styles of butterfly stroke are similar to the two styles above but without a "second" dolphin kick. This allows the swimmer to conserve energy and be more relaxed.

FINA butterfly stroke rules 
SW 8.1 From the beginning of the first arm stroke after the start and each turn, the body shall be kept on the breast. Underwater kicking on the side is allowed. It is not permitted to roll onto the back at any time.

SW 8.2 Both arms shall be brought forward together over the water and brought backward simultaneously throughout the race, subject to SW 8.5.

SW 8.3 All up and down movements of the legs must be simultaneous. The legs or the feet need not be on the same level, but they shall not alternate. A breaststroke kicking movement is not permitted.

SW 8.4 Both hands must touch the wall simultaneously at each turn and finish of the race, whether above or below the water surface.

SW 8.5 At the start and turns, a swimmer is permitted one or more leg kicks and one arm pull under the water, which must bring them to the surface. It shall be permissible for a swimmer to be completely submerged for a distance of not more than 15 metres after the start and after each turn. By that point, the head must have broken the surface. The swimmer must remain on the surface until the next turn or finish.

References

External links 
 

 
Swimming styles